Edgar Raymond Darby Hinton (born August 19, 1957) is an American actor. His parents were actor Ed Hinton (1919–1958) and Marilyn Mau Hinton (1922–1982). Both of his sisters, Darcy and Daryn Hinton, were actresses from childhood. Hinton is best known for playing Israel Boone on Daniel Boone.

Hinton’s acting debut was as an infant in a 1958 Playhouse 90 episode with his father. His other early roles were on Mister Ed, Route 66, Wagon Train, and The Adventures of Ozzie and Harriet.

When Hinton was six years old, his mother left him off at 20th-Century Fox to audition for a part in The Sound of Music, and then she went to park the car. Hinton made a mistake, stood in line for Daniel Boone auditions, and so impressed the casting department that he was signed for the role of Israel Boone,  though they had been looking for an older boy for the part. He was on the series from 1964 to 1970, and became especially close to Fess Parker, who played his father. Hinton had been only a year old when his own father died, and Parker became a father figure to him. 

After Daniel Boone ended, Hinton continued acting. He was in the 1978 film Goodbye, Franklin High, the 1979 ABC special When the West Was Fun: A Western Reunion, and the 1985 film Malibu Express. From 1985 to 1986, Hinton played Ian Griffith on Days of Our Lives In 2015, Hinton appeared as David G. Burnet in Texas Rising, which was shown on History.

Personal life
In 1983, Hinton married Diannale Preisman. The couple had two children, Nick and Dakota, before divorcing. He later married Shan Griffiths, and had two more children, Ryder and India.

References

External links

1957 births
20th-century American male actors
21st-century American male actors
Male actors from California
American male child actors
American male film actors
American male television actors
People from Greater Los Angeles
Pepperdine University alumni
Living people